"A Lying Witch and a Warden" is the series premiere of the American animated television series The Owl House. In the episode, Luz Noceda, a 14-year-old Afro-Dominican-American girl known for being unpredictable and troublesome, accidentally stumbles upon a portal to the Demon Realm, where she arrives at the Boiling Isles, an archipelago. To help get home to her own world, she is enlisted as the helper of rebellious witch Eda Clawthorne.

The episode premiered on January 10, 2020 on Disney Channel and garnered 0.61 million viewers when it premiered, although receiving a mixed reception from audiences.

Plot 
In the first scene of the episode, as well as the series, Luz Noceda, a 14-year-old Afro-Dominican-American girl who is known for her creative and expressive personality, explains her book report to her principal. The principal called her into his office because of her choices for props, which include snakes and rockets. It is revealed that due to her creativity and expressiveness, she has gotten into trouble at her school numerous times due to her weirding out her peers. In response, Luz's mother, Camila, decides to send her to a summer camp with the intent of straightening out her wild and imaginative personality. On the day she is supposed to leave for the camp, however, an owl steals her favorite book. She chases down the owl to an abandoned house in the middle of the woods. She decides to continue giving chase to the owl, and when she enters through the door, she ends up in a market in an unknown place. She eventually finds out that she has been transported to another world different from hers. She eventually gets her book back; however, when she tries to go back, the door that connects the two worlds closes to Luz's horror.

The owner of the market stand she has ended up at introduces herself as Eda the Owl Lady, better known as Eda Clawthorne. Eda tries to sell random human items to Luz, but to no avail. Luz finds a TV and turns it on, attracting customers to Eda's stand. Eventually, authorities come to arrest Eda and Luz, but they escape using Eda's staff. Luz learns from Eda that she is in a world called the Boiling Isles, where myths from the human world come from. Luz asks Eda to get back home, but Eda asks for a favor first. After taking Luz to The Owl House, Eda's residence, Luz meets King, a demon. Eda explains that she needs help with the fact that King himself was once considered a "King of Demons" until his Crown of Power was stolen by a warden, where its location can only be broken through by a human. Eda asks for Luz's help to break in for the promise that Eda would help return Luz home. Luz reluctantly accepts, and the three head over to the Conformatorium, where people the Boiling Isles deem unfit for society are housed.

The three decide to sneak up to the top of the tower. While trying to sneak into the tower, Luz meets Katya, a prisoner who is charged with the crime of writing fanfiction with vegetable characters. Along the way, she meets other prisoners who have been charged for "being different", making Luz feel bad for the prisoners, saying none of them had actually done anything wrong. The three eventually reunite at the top of the tower and open the door to the room where the crown is held. Luz gets the crown only to find out it is a kid's meal crown that has no actual value; expect intrinsic value to King. Suddenly, the warden comes and chops off Eda's head. Eda is still alive, however; eventually, the warden asks Eda out on a date. Eda refuses, and starts to fight the warden and his guards along with King. Luz decides to escape and free the prisoners. After helping Eda defeat the warden, Eda keeps her promise and eventually gives Luz the choice to return to her world. However, Luz decides to stay in the Boiling Isles after thinking through how people had treated her in her world. Eda lets her stay until Luz's camp ends on the condition that Luz works for her and becomes her apprentice.

Production 
Before the episode was released to the general public, the show had been renewed by The Walt Disney Company for a full second season. According to show creator Dana Terrace, the main character of the series, Luz Noceda had an emotional journey similar to Terrace's in terms of trying to find a community when she was a creative person. Voice actors Sarah-Nicole Robles and Alex Hirsch in an interview with Comic Book Resources said that they had thought Luz was a person who had been artistically restricted by the society created around her.

Critical reception 
Dave Trumbore, writer for the film website Collider, would give a highly positive review of the episode, saying that the episode had brought the series with promise. He would praise the relationship brought upon by Luz Noceda and Eda Clawthorne, along with a "balanced mix of chaos, ingenuity, and cuteness" in the episode. He would go on to say that the episode itself was a good introduction for the series, and gave the episode four out of five stars.

Kevin Johnson, writer for The A.V. Club, would praise the magical world brought by the Boiling Isles, comparing the magic of the world to fellow Disney Channel show Gravity Falls. He also would write about the conflict about a person trying to be themselves at a certain cost; in this instance, Luz trying to be a witch but instead lying to her mom.

The episode, along with the show itself faced criticism by many Christian groups. The Christian Broadcasting Network panned the show for portraying witchcraft as a positive idea to fight evil, along with the group believing that the show promoted children into believing that evil and demons were good. One Million Moms, a group by the American Family Association that has the stated goal to " stop the exploitation of children" by the media started a petition to get the show off the air.

References

External links 

 

The Owl House (season 1) episodes
American television series premieres